is a railway station in the city of Shimada, Shizuoka Prefecture, Japan,  operated by the Ōigawa Railway.

Lines
Shin-Kanaya Station is on the Ōigawa Main Line and is 2.3 from the terminus of the line at Kanaya Station.

Station layout
The station has a single island platform. The station has a turntable and a locomotive maintenance shed, both primarily used for steam locomotives. The station has many shunt tracks, and is a boneyard for obsolete locomotives formerly in use on the Ōigawa Railway or the Japan National Railway. The station building is a two-story clapboard wooden structure connected to the platform by a level crossing. The station is staffed.

Adjacent stations

|-
!colspan=5|Ōigawa Railway

Station history
Shin-Kanaya Station was opened on June 10, 1927, the same day that the Ōigawa Railway began service.

Passenger statistics
In fiscal 2017, the station was used by an average of 504 passengers daily (boarding passengers only).

Surrounding area
Nippon Saemon Kubiki-zuka

See also
 List of Railway Stations in Japan

References

External links

 Ōigawa Railway home page

Stations of Ōigawa Railway
Railway stations in Shizuoka Prefecture
Railway stations in Japan opened in 1927
Shimada, Shizuoka